Tephritis leavittensis is a species of tephritid or fruit flies in the genus Tephritis of the family Tephritidae.

Distribution
United States.

References

Tephritinae
Insects described in 1979
Diptera of North America